The women's 60 metres event  at the 1990 European Athletics Indoor Championships was held in Kelvin Hall on 3 March.

Medalists

Result

Heats
First 2 from each heat (Q) and the next 4 fastest (q) qualified for the semifinals.

Semifinals
First 2 from each semifinal (Q) and the next 2 fastest (q) qualified for the final.

Final

References

60 metres at the European Athletics Indoor Championships
60
1990 in women's athletics